Boris Yulyevich Kagarlitsky (born 29 August 1958) is a Russian Marxist theoretician and sociologist who has been a political dissident in the Soviet Union. He is coordinator of the Transnational Institute Global Crisis project and Director of the Institute of Globalization and Social Movements (IGSO) in Moscow. Kagarlisky hosts a YouTube channel Rabkor, associated with his online newspaper of the same name and with IGSO.

Political activities
In the 1970s, he studied theatre criticism at the State Institute of Theatrical Art (GITIS), before being expelled for dissident activities in 1980. His editorship of the samizdat journal Levy Povorot (Left Turn) from 1978 to 1982, and contributions to the samizdat journal Varianty (Variants) during the same period, led to his arrest for 'anti-Soviet' activities in 1982. He was pardoned and released in 1983. 

In 1988 he published his book, The Thinking Reed: Intellectuals and the Soviet State From 1917 to the Present, which won the Deutscher Memorial Prize .

In October 1993, the former Soviet dissident was arrested, with two other members of his party, for his opposition to President Boris Yeltsin during the September—October constitutional crisis, but was released the next day after international protests. Later that year, his job and the Moscow City Soviet were abolished under Yeltsin's new constitution. The events and his experiences during this momentous period are documented in his book, Square Wheels: How Russian Democracy Got Derailed.

Kagarlitsky is the director of Institute of Globalisation Studies and Social Movements (IGSO) and editor in chief of Levaya Politika (Left Politics) quarterly in Moscow.

He was criticized by Mikhail Vasilyevich Popov.

Academic career
From 1994 to 2002, he was a senior research fellow at the Institute for Comparative Political Studies of the Russian Academy of Sciences (ISPRAN). He was awarded his Doctorate degree for his thesis, Collective Actions and Labour Policies in Russia in the 90s, in 1995, and has taught political science at Moscow State University, the Moscow School for Social and Economic Sciences, and the Institute of Sociology of the Russian Academy of Sciences.

Books in English 
 Thinking Reed: The Intellectuals and the Soviet State 1917 to the Present, Verso Books, 1989, 
 The Dialectic of Change, Verso Books, 1990, 
 Farewell Perestroika: A Soviet Chronicle, Verso Books, 1990, 
 The Disintegration of the Monolith, Verso Books, 1993, 
 Square Wheels: How Russian Democracy Got Derailed, Monthly Review Press, 1994, 
 Mirage of Modernization, Monthly Review Press, 1995, 
 Restoration in Russia: Why Capitalism Failed, Verso Books, 1995, 
 Globalization and Its Discontents: The Rise of Postmodern Socialisms, co-edited with Roger Burbach and Orlando Nunez, Pluto Press, 1997, 
 New Realism, New Barbarism: Socialist Theory in the Era of Globalization, Pluto Press, 1999, 
 The Return of Radicalism: Reshaping the Left Institutions, Pluto Press, 1999, 
 The Twilight of Globalization: Property, State and Capitalism, Pluto Press, 2000, 
 Russia Under Yeltsin and Putin: Neo-Liberal Autocracy, Pluto Press, 2002, 
 The Politics of Empire: Globalisation in Crisis, co-edited with Alan Freeman, Pluto Press, 2004, 
 Empire of the Periphery: Russia and the World System, Pluto Press, 2007, 
 Back in the USSR (What Was Communism?), Seagull Books, 2009, 
 From Empires to Imperialism: The State and the Rise of Bourgeois Civilisation, Routledge, 2014, 
 Russia, Ukraine and Contemporary Imperialism, Routledge, 2019, 
 Between Class and Discourse: Left Intellectuals in Defence of Capitalism, Routledge, 2020,

References

External links

Biographical
Official website
Unofficial website
Boris Kagarlitsky's IGSO profile
Boris Kagarlitsky's profile on the Transnational Institute, with columns, articles, interviews, etc.
Rabkor on Youtube

Articles
Boris Kagarlitsky on Russian Dissent via Substack
Boris Kagarlitsky's ZSpace Page
Boris Kagarlitsky at Eurasian Home
Boris Kagarlitsky at Rabkor
Boris Kagarlitsky at Scepsis

Interviews
New period for Russia, Weekly Worker, March 16, 2006
Class-consciousness and the naked king, Weekly Worker, May 10, 2007
TV interview on the night of the 2008 Russian presidential election, Russia Today, March 2, 2008

Papers and essays
Facing the Crisis, Paper presented at the Global Crisis Seminar, TNI, Amsterdam, 17–18 February 2002
A Black Cat in a Dark Room, TNI Website, 27 October 2004
Russia 1917 and the global revolution, Weekly Worker, October 26, 2006
Fuse workers’ movement and Marxism, Weekly Worker, November 9, 2006

Video
"The Left and Labour in Russia Under Putin" Socialist Project, April 3, 2008
Viewpoint. Boris Kagarlitsky about workers' movement at Red TV 
How Russia's War In Ukraine Is Playing Out Inside Russia - BreakThrough News, YouTube

1958 births
Living people
Writers from Moscow
Marxist theorists
Russian Marxist historians
Deutscher Memorial Prize winners
Labor historians
Russian sociologists
Russian politicians
Russian political writers
Russian journalists
Russian Marxists
Russian political activists
Russian socialists
Russian communists
Russian dissidents
Soviet dissidents
Libertarian socialists
World system scholars
Russian bloggers
Russian YouTubers
Russian activists against the 2022 Russian invasion of Ukraine
Russian atheists
Russian political scientists
Russian Academy of Theatre Arts alumni
People listed in Russia as media foreign agents
Russian video bloggers